Staraya Poltavka is a rural locality (a selo) and the administrative center of Staropoltavsky District of Volgograd Oblast, Russia, located on the Yeruslan River.

It was founded in the first half of the 19th century by immigrants from Ukraine.

The nearest railway station is at Gmelinskaya, on the Volgograd–Saratov line.

References

Notes

Sources

Rural localities in Staropoltavsky District